Veľké Dvorníky is a village and municipality in the Dunajská Streda District in the Trnava Region of south-west Slovakia. Its former Slovak name is Dvorníky na Ostrove.

Geography
The municipality lies at an altitude of 114 metres and covers an area of 7.991 km².

History
In the 9th century, the territory of Veľké Dvorníky became part of the Kingdom of Hungary. The village was first recorded in 1162 as village inhabited by people with Udvarnok social status which meant half-free people in the service of the kings of Hungary and Pozsony Castle. Until the end of World War I, it was part of Hungary and fell within the Dunaszerdahely district of Pozsony County. After the Austro-Hungarian army disintegrated in November 1918, Czechoslovak troops occupied the area. After the Treaty of Trianon of 1920, the village became officially part of Czechoslovakia. In November 1938, the First Vienna Award granted the area to Hungary and it was held by Hungary until 1945. The present-day municipality was formed in 1940 by unifying the three component villages. After Soviet occupation in 1945, Czechoslovak administration returned and the village became officially part of Czechoslovakia in 1947.

Demography 
In 1910, the village had 389, for the most part, Hungarian inhabitants. At the 2001 Census the recorded population of the village was 795 while an end-2008 estimate by the Statistical Office had the villages's population also as 959. As of 2001, 95.85% of its population were Hungarians while 3.14% were Slovaks.

Roman Catholicism is the majority religion of the village, its adherents numbering 91.95% of the total population.

References

External links
Local news selection at Új Szó on-line 
Local news selection at www.parameter.hu 
Mestá-Obce.sk 
Postcard showing the village
Local football club
The Garden of the Castle

Villages and municipalities in Dunajská Streda District
Hungarian communities in Slovakia